Bentworth Hall is a country house in the parish of Bentworth in Hampshire, England.

Before the 1830s, the building called Bentworth Hall or Bentworth Manor House is now re-named Hall Place. 
It was built in the early 14th century and is a Grade II listed building. The current Bentworth Hall is surrounded by woodland that was planted during building which started in 1832, after Roger Staples Horman-Fisher purchased the Bentworth Manor estate.

1832 – Building the new Bentworth Hall

In 1832, the Bentworth Hall estate of about 500 acres was sold at Garraway's Coffee House in the City of London by the Fitzherbert family. The Fitzherberts were relatives of Maria Fitzherbert, the illegal wife of the Prince Regent, later George IV (illegal because although George married Maria Fitzherbert, she was a Roman Catholic and banned by Act of Parliament from marrying into the Royal Family).

  

The Bentworth Hall estate was purchased by Roger Staples Horman-Fisher for about £6000.

private drive from the Bentworth-Medstead road.

The book "Heraldic Illustrations" by Sir Bernard Burke, Ulster King of Arms, stated the following about the Horman-Fisher family.  Capitals and abbreviations are as in the original:

"ROGER STAPLES HORMAN-FISHER, Esq., of Bentworth Hall, eldest son of the late Robert Fisher, Esq. of the Inner Temple, and of Mitcham, Surrey, by Mary, his second wife, dau. of Charles Staples, Esq. of London, by Mary, his wife, dau. and heir of Baron Butz, a German noble, bears a quartered shield, FISHER and HORMAN, and an escutcheon of pretence for HORMAN, in right of his wife, Elizabeth, dau. and heir of John Horman, Esq. of Finchley."

It would appear that proof reading in those days was not very good, because under the Horman-Fisher crest, Bentworth is spelled "Brereworth", and the heading of the extract quoted above says "Fisher, of Bentworth Hall, Hants" omitting the name "Horman" which in the copy referred to in this entry was added in pencil.

1848 – Sale of Bentworth Hall Estate
 In 1848 the Bentworth Hall estate was sold to Jeremiah Robert Ives, including the Old Manor House (now Hall Place) and the more recent 1832-built Bentworth Hall. The sale catalogue dated 16 July 1848 includes the following rather exaggerated description:

"A handsome newly erected Elizabethan (sic) mansion of unique elevation with wall garden, elegant conservatory and stabling. The mansion is built in the most substantial manner and finished without reference to expense, by the proprietor for his own residence. The walls are constructed almost entirely of BLACK FLINT (emphasised in capitals in the original), carefully and minutely cut and smoothed at an incalculable cost, with Stone Cornices, mullions &C blending a beautiful and unique specimen of workmanship with a suitability and durability impenetrable to every change of atmosphere. Six airy and cheerful Family Bedrooms, spacious landing and a broad light principle (sic) staircase leads to the Ground Floor on which is another water closet.

Later 19th century
Robert Ives died in 1865 and the estate passed to his widow Emma.  The Ives family later included George Cecil Ives who lived for a time at Bentworth Hall. George Cecil Ives met Oscar Wilde and Lord Alfred Douglas in London, publishing books on history and homosexuality.

Emma Ives died seven years later and ownership of the Bentworth Hall estate passed to Colonel Gordon-Ives who continued to live at Gaston Grange.

Early 20th century
 Colonel Gordon-Ives rented Bentworth Hall to W. G. Nicholson, member of Parliament for Petersfield.  The caption on the photo states:

"Bentworth Hall, Bentworth, tenanted by W. G. Nicholson, M.P., J.P. Bentworth Hall is a large Mansion built about eighty years since of squared flints and stone.  The flint work is held to be a fine specimen of its kind.  The house stands in a park of 400 acres, and is the property of Colonel Gordon-Ives, C.B."

The small crenellated tower on the right in the photo is believed to have been a water tower, but has subsequently disappeared, as have the canopies over the ground floor windows on the south west side. In later photos the tower is almost completely covered with ivy.

Colonel Gordon-Ives died on 8 September 1907 and the estate passed to his son, Cecil Maynard Gordon-Ives, a Captain in the Scots Guards in the 1914–18 war, who occupied it until his death on 23 July 1923. The Bentworth Hall Estate, then of 479 acres, was offered for sale by John D Wood & Co of 6 Mount St London W1 on 19 July 1924.

The sale document states, with capitals and punctuation as in the original:  "THE CAPITAL AND SPORTING RESIDENTIAL ESTATE of about 479 acres, lies compactly together, with a FLINT AND STONE-BUILT MANOR HOUSE, approached by long avenue drive through richly timbered park, stands nearly 600ft. above sea, and contains fourteen bed and dressing, two bath, five reception rooms, halls, billiard room, good offices.  ELECTRIC LIGHT.  CENTRAL HEATING.  AMPLE WATER.  LODGE.  COTTAGES.  EXCELLENT STABLING. INEXPENSIVE SHADY OLD GROUNDS.  TUDOR (sic) FARMHOUSE.  EXCELLENT BUILDINGS"

The sale was in 7 Lots, Lot 7 being for the "Lordship of Manor."

It was offered again for sale on 26 June 1930, by direction of A d’A Willis who presumably purchased it in 1924. The purchaser may have been Major John Arthur Pryor because he is recorded as living at Bentworth Hall in the 1930s.

World War II

At the beginning of the war, the Bentworth Hall estate was taken over by the military together with other local large houses and estates such as Gaston Grange and Thedden Grange.

In 1941 Bentworth Hall was occupied by a unit of the Mobile Naval Base Defence Organisation (MNBDO) as an out-station of Haslar Naval Hospital in Portsmouth. The bedrooms were the wards and there was a doctor's office upstairs. The upstairs bathroom in the middle of the west wing was a darkroom for developing X-ray plates, presumably because it had one relatively small window that was easy to cover.

 

Later, other military organisations were there because in the woods there is a carving of "48 CDO" on one of the trees. This refers to the British 48 Marine Commando which presumably had a unit at Bentworth Hall before their main body deployed abroad for operations. Several Nissen huts were erected in the woods to the west of the Hall and the concrete bases of several of them are still there (in 2019) together with small amounts of the corrugated iron which covered them, although some concrete was removed in the 1980s because it was causing vegetation and trees to die.

 

In 1944 Bentworth Hall was occupied by American and British Commonwealth personnel.  A swimming pool had been put in, also two cookhouses and a water tower.  Huts in the woods were for accommodation although some officers lived in the Hall itself.  The cornfield to the SW was an airstrip with 3 L4 light aircraft (the US Army version of the Piper Cub) which the Colonel used to fly to the airfield at Lasham

The above information came from Michael (Mick) Lennox, ex US Army, who visited Bentworth Hall from his home in New York on 6 June 1994 (the day of D-Day 50 years earlier).  Lennox said that he had been accommodated in one of the huts in the woods before D-day and on walking round the woods, he located where his bed-space would have been.

After the War

An ordnance disposal unit operated in the corner of the wood near the field to the south, towards Colliers Wood.  Ordnance was taken to the hollow or "dell" in the field and detonated there.

In 1947, the Bentworth Hall estate was bought by Major Herbert Cecil Benyon Berens, who was a director of Hambros bank in London from 1968. In 1950, Major Berens built two new lodge houses at the junction of the drive to Bentworth Hall with the main road through the village towards Medstead. He also built an extension to the south of the centre of Bentworth Hall itself with tall windows down to ground level facing south west. The walls of the extension matched the squared flint of the main building, and the extension was known as the "Garden Rooms" – compare the photo of the south side in 1983 with earlier photos.

Major Berens was a keen game shooter and each year his keeper raised pheasants in the old stable and coach block before the young birds were put into the woods. There was accommodation for the keeper in the stable block with one downstairs and one upstairs room.  In the 1970s the keeper was "Ginger" Woods, a well-known village character who also lived in house on the road between Bentworth and Medstead near the cricket pitch, land that was owned by the Berens family.

Major Berens died at Bentworth Hall on 27 October 1981 and after this the remaining estate was put up for sale.

The hall was first offered as a single property but this did not sell, part of the building being in a dilapidated state with leaks in the roof and plaster fallen off the walls, particularly in the centre section of the Hall.

It was then offered for sale as five so-called "dwelling units" with the main house split into three units, each with several bedrooms, and the old stable block divided into two units.

Sales of the five units commenced in 1983, the Strachan family being the first to move in to the West Wing in March 1983.  Wing Commander Ian Strachan MBE AFC was then serving as a Squadron Commander at the Ministry of Defence flight test establishment at Boscombe Down near Amesbury in Wiltshire, and later commuted from Bentworth to the Ministry of Defence in Whitehall before retiring in 1993.

In 1983, the Bentworth Hall stable block to the NE was still stabling with hay still in some of the mangers and there was a large wooden door at the NE end which in the past would have been used for horse-drawn coaches.  Later in 1983 the stable block was bought by the Varleys who converted it into two dwellings that were called The Coach House and Stable Cottage.

 

Stella Strachan is a keen gardener and further developed the West Wing garden, particularly re-furbishing the sunken garden SW of the West Wing that had originally been installed in late Victorian times.

She is also founder chairman of the Bentworth Garden Club that was formed in 2001 after the Bentworth area Millennium survey had identified a desire for such an organisation.

The West Wing garden is opened for special events associated with the Bentworth Garden Club and other local organisations.

References

Country houses in Hampshire
East Hampshire District
Houses completed in 1832
Manor houses in England